Sheikhpur or Shaikhpur may refer to:

 Sheikhpur, Ballia, a village in UP, India
 Shaikhpur, Handaur, Pratapgarh another village in UP, India
 Sheikhpur, Kharian, a village in Langria tehsil in Punjab, Pakistan

See also 
 Sheikhpura, a city in Bihar, India
 Sheikhupura, a city in Pakistan